Devendra Fadnavis was sworn in as the chief minister of Maharashtra for the second time on 23 November 2019. Alongside Fadnavis, Ajit Pawar was sworn in as the deputy chief minister. Before a Supreme Court-ordered no confidence motion could take place, Pawar resigned on 26 November. Fadnavis resigned shortly thereafter, making his second ministry the shortest Maharashtra ministry, surpassing P. K. Sawant's 1963 interim government, that had lasted for nine days.

Government formation
In 2019 Maharashtra elections, the ruling National Democratic Alliance, consisting of Fadnavis' Bharatiya Janata Party, Shiv Sena, and other smaller parties, won a majority of seats. Fadnavis was seeking a second-term as chief minister, however, Shiv Sena insisted that the two parties share the tenure in accordance with a "50:50 formula". This meant that the parties would hold the chief ministerial office on a rotational basis. Following failure to reach an agreement and to form a government, Fadnavis resigned. As the Governor Bhagat Singh Koshiyari found out, after consultation with major political parties, that none of them was in a position to form a government, President's rule was imposed in the state.

After Fadnavis' resignation, it was expected that Shiv Sena would form a coalition government with Congress and Nationalist Congress Party. However, in early hours of 23 November 2019, President's rule was revoked and Fadnavis took oath as chief minister, alongside Pawar, who was sworn in as deputy chief minister.

Political crisis and resignation
Nationalist Congress Party chief and Ajit Pawar's uncle, Sharad Pawar, announced after the swearing-in, that Ajit Pawar's decision to join Fadnavis' ministry was not endorsed by his party. It was initially unclear if any other Nationalist Congress legislators were supportive of Ajit Pawar's decision. Eleven legislators were present at the early morning swearing in, however, three of them had clarified in a press conference on the same day that they had been misled.

Two days later, on 25 November, 162 legislators (Maharashtra Assembly has a total strength of 288), met in Mumbai, evincing that Fadnavis' government did not enjoy majority support. Simultaneously, a plea had been filed before the Supreme Court regarding the political crisis in the state. On 26 November 2016, the Supreme Court ruled that the Fadnavis government must prove its majority in the Assembly on the next day. Pawar resigned as deputy chief minister shortly thereafter, followed by Fadnavis.

Two days later, on 28 November, Uddhav Thackeray was appointed the chief minister, leading a coalition government.

Council of ministers

|}

Notes

References

Bharatiya Janata Party state ministries
2019 establishments in Maharashtra
2019 in Indian politics
Fadnavis 02
Republican Party of India (Athawale)
Nationalist Congress Party
2019 disestablishments in India
Cabinets established in 2019
Cabinets disestablished in 2019